FC Avangard Podolsk was a Russian association football club from Podolsk, existed in 2001–2010. The club played in the Russian Second Division in 2009–2010. In the past, the club was called FC Vityaz-2 Podolsk (2001–2005) and FC ZIO-Podolsk (2006–2007). In December 2010 it merged with FC Vityaz Podolsk.

External links
Fan site

Association football clubs established in 2001
Football clubs in Russia
Football in Moscow Oblast
2001 establishments in Russia
2010 disestablishments in Russia